Pelly-Nisutlin is an electoral district which returns a member (known as an MLA) to the Legislative Assembly of the Yukon Territory in Canada. It was created in 2002 out of the districts of Faro and Ross River-Southern Lakes. The riding includes the communities of Teslin, Faro, Ross River, Little Salmon, and Johnsons Crossing. It encompasses the traditional territory of the Teslin Tlingit Council and the Ross River Dena Council of the Kaska Dena. Pelly-Nisutlin is bordered by the rural ridings of Mayo-Tatchun, Lake Laberge, Mount Lorne-Southern Lakes, and Watson Lake.

Boundary Commission Controversy

Yukon electoral boundaries are examined by a commission every ten years to determine whether they should be adjusted. When Pelly-Nisutlin was created, it drew criticism from the Village of Teslin and the Teslin Tlingit Council, which argued that it should not be part of the same riding as Ross River and Faro, but rather Carcross and Tagish. There was concern not only that the MLA representing the district would face challenges representing and travelling to the communities of such a vast area (Faro is better accessed through Whitehorse), but also because there were greater commonalities between the Teslin Tlingit Council and the Carcross/Tagish First Nation.

Accordingly, the commission considered dismantling the electoral district and redistributing it into neighbouring districts, but rejected the option as it would create a greater imbalance between rural and urban seats in the Yukon. It also rejected the suggestion that Teslin form its own riding, since it was seen as too small in population. The report concluded: "while we acknowledge that the relationship of the Teslin area to the remainder of the electoral district is somewhat of an anomaly, we are unable to propose a justifiable solution other than to retain the district within its current boundaries."

Members of the Legislative Assembly

Election results

2021 general election

2016 general election

|-

|-

|NDP
|Ken Hodgins
|align="right"| 207
|align="right"| 31.2%
|align="right"| -0.8%
|-
 
| style="width: 130px" |Liberal
|Carl Sidney
|align="right"| 152
|align="right"| 23.0%
|align="right"| +9.9%
|-

|-
|- bgcolor="white"
!align="left" colspan=3|Total
!align="right"| 661
!align="right"| 100.0%
!align="right"|–

2011 general election

|-

|-

|NDP
|Carol Geddes
|align="right"| 178
|align="right"| 32.0%
|align="right"|+6.5%
|-
 
| style="width: 130px" |Liberal
|Carl Sidney
|align="right"| 73
|align="right"| 13.1%
|align="right"|-12.3%
|-

| style="width: 130px" |Independent
|Elvis Presley
|align="right"| 31
|align="right"| 5.5%
|align="right"|-1.5%
|- bgcolor="white"
!align="left" colspan=3|Total
!align="right"| 557
!align="right"| 100.0%
!align="right"| –

2006 general election

|-

|NDP
|Gwen Wally
|align="right"|146
|align="right"|25.5%
|align="right"|+0.2%
|-
 
| style="width: 130px" |Liberal
|Hammond Dick
|align="right"|145
|align="right"|25.4%
|align="right"|-2.9%
|-

| style="width: 130px" |Independent
|Elvis Aaron Presley ("Tagish" Elvis)
|align="right"|40
|align="right"|7.0%
|align="right"| +7.0%
|- bgcolor="white"
!align="left" colspan=3|Total
!align="right"|572
!align="right"|100.0%
!align="right"| –

2002 general election
 
|-

 
| style="width: 130px" |Liberal
| Jim McLachlan
|align="right"| 181
|align="right"| 28.3%
|align="right"|  –
|-

|NDP
|Buzz Burgess
|align="right"| 162
|align="right"| 25.3%
|align="right"| –
|- bgcolor="white"
!align="left" colspan=3|Total
!align="right"|640
!align="right"|100.0%
!align="right"| –

References

Yukon territorial electoral districts